Louds may refer to:

Louds Island, in the Atlantic Ocean off the coast of Round Pond, Maine
Shout Out Louds, indie rock band from Stockholm, Sweden
The Louds, family in the documentary An American Family
The Loud family, from the Nickelodeon series The Loud House

See also
Loud (disambiguation)
Loudes